Several ships of the Royal Navy have been named HMS Prometheus. 

 , launched in 1807, was involved an action in the Gulf of Finland in the Baltic in 1809 (see  or ). She was used for harbour service from 1819, renamed  (fireship) in 1839 and broken up in 1852.
  was an  paddle sloop launched in 1839.
  was a  protected cruiser launched in 1898, and sold in 1914.

Royal Navy ship names